is a Japanese actress.

Mimura is best known for her role as Kayoko Kotohiki in Battle Royale.

She also appears as a supporting role in Linda Linda Linda.

External links 

Japanese film actresses
Japanese television actresses
Living people
People from Ibaraki Prefecture
1985 births
Stardust Promotion artists
21st-century Japanese actresses
Actors from Ibaraki Prefecture